The 11th Bangladesh National Film Awards were presented by the Ministry of Information, Bangladesh, to felicitate the best of Bangladeshi cinema released in the year 1986. The Bangladesh National Film Awards is a film award ceremony in Bangladesh established in 1975 by the government of Bangladesh.  Every year, a national panel appointed by the government selects the winning entry, and the award ceremony is held in Dhaka. 1986 was the 11th ceremony of Bangladesh National Film Award.

List of winners
A total of 16 artists were awarded in this ceremony. Best Screenplay award was not given in 1986.

Merit awards

Technical awards

See also
 Meril Prothom Alo Awards
 Ifad Film Club Award
 Babisas Award

References

External links

National Film Awards (Bangladesh) ceremonies
1986 film awards
1988 awards in Bangladesh
1988 in Dhaka
June 1988 events in Bangladesh